MOMus Photography, in full MOMus–Thessaloniki Museum of Photography, is located in Thessaloniki, Central Macedonia, Greece. It is currently housed in Warehouse A, Pier A, at the Port of Thessaloniki, next to the Cinema Museum of Thessaloniki. It was formerly known as the Thessaloniki Museum of Photography.

History
The museum was founded in 1987 by Aris Georgiou, Apostolos Maroulis and Yiannis Vanidis but it was not until 1997 that it was legally established and until 1998 that it opened with Giorgos Makris as its president and Aris Georgiou as its first director.

The museum's mission is to collect photographs, especially historical and artistic photographs of Greece, to organize exhibitions and events to show the museum's collection, to join forces with other similar bodies and work together and to publish books on photography.

The museum has 57 photographs and 700 negatives by photographer Nelly's, photographer Sokratis Iordanidis's archive, with themes from fashion, news stories, cityscapes and such like from the 1950s, 60s and 70s, and is ready to go ahead with the purchase of the collection entitled Picture and Image (the work of 39 contemporary Greek photographers), the archive of photographer Giannis Stylianos and part of the collection entitled New Images.

Since 1999 the museum has collaborated with a host of Greek and international bodies to undertake the organization of Photo Synkyria, the country's most important and longest-lasting photographic institution.

Since 2018, the museum has merged with MOMus Modern, MOMus Experimental, MOMus Contemporary, and other institutions under the Metropolitan Organisation of Museums of Visual Arts of Thessaloniki (MOMus) umbrella.

Gallery

References

External links

Archive of former website

Museums in Thessaloniki
Photography museums and galleries in Greece
Art museums established in 1998
1998 establishments in Greece